Nebria aborana is a species of ground beetle from Nebriinae subfamily that is endemic to Yunnan province of China.

References

Beetles described in 1925
Beetles of Asia
Endemic fauna of Yunnan
aborana